is a Japanese swimmer. He competed in the men's 4 × 100 metre freestyle relay at the 2020 Summer Olympics.

References

External links
 

1996 births
Living people
Japanese male freestyle swimmers
Olympic swimmers of Japan
Swimmers at the 2020 Summer Olympics
People from Yokkaichi
20th-century Japanese people
21st-century Japanese people